The 1969 USS Enterprise fire was a major fire and series of explosions that broke out aboard  on January 14, 1969, off the coast of Oahu, Hawaii. The fire started when a Zuni rocket detonated under a plane's wing. It spread as more munitions exploded, blowing holes in the flight deck that allowed burning jet fuel to enter the ship. 28 sailors were killed, 314 were injured, 15 aircraft were destroyed, and the total cost of aircraft replacement and shipboard repair was over $126 million (roughly $1.017 billion adjusted for inflation in 2022). The damage was lessened somewhat by improvements made after the similar 1967 USS Forrestal fire.

Background 
, built between 1958 and 1961, was the world's first nuclear-powered aircraft carrier. Its enormous construction cost caused the cancellation of the five other carriers planned for the class.

Enterprise departed Alameda, California, on January 6, 1969, for its fourth deployment to Vietnam and its eighth deployment overall. On January 14, the ship was off the coast of Hawaii conducting a final battle drill and Operational Readiness Inspection (ORI) before steaming for Vietnam. Additional personnel were aboard Enterprise to observe the ORI.

Fire 

About 8:18 a.m., Enterprise was turning to port to conduct flight operations. On the stern sat a McDonnell Douglas F-4 Phantom II armed with Zuni rockets. The exhaust from an MD-3A "Huffer", a tractor-mounted unit used to start aircraft, heated one of the Zunis until it exploded, detonating its  warhead of Composition B explosive. The explosion perforated the aircraft's fuel cells and ignited the leaking JP-5 jet fuel. About one minute later, three more Zuni rockets exploded; these blasts blew holes into the flight deck, allowing the burning jet fuel to pour into the level below. Captain Kent Lee, commanding officer of Enterprise, directed the port turn to continue after the first explosion, steering the ship into the wind to blow smoke away from the ship.

The heat ignited additional fires on the lower level, and debris caused holes in the deck which allowed burning fuel to spread farther, entering the two lower levels and eventually the first deck. This explosion also severed nearby firehoses and damaged and rendered inoperable the twin-agent units that provided firefighting foam to the area. Two  Mark 82 bombs soon detonated in succession. Several minutes after those detonations, a bomb rack exploded with three Mark 82 bombs. A total of 18 explosions occurred, blowing eight holes into the flight deck and beyond.

The nuclear-powered cruiser  and destroyer  came to the stricken carrier's aid. It took the combined crews of the three ships about four hours to extinguish the fires.

Aftermath 
Bainbridge escorted Enterprise to Pearl Harbor that afternoon. After 51 days of repairs, Enterprise continued its regularly scheduled deployment. The carrier returned to Alameda on July 2, 1969.

This was the last of three major fires to befall U.S. aircraft carriers in the 1960s. It followed a fire aboard USS Oriskany on October 26, 1966, that killed 44 sailors and injured 156 more; and a fire aboard USS Forrestal on July 29, 1967, that killed 134 sailors and injured 161.  The Forrestal fire was also started by a Zuni rocket which was accidentally launched into parked aircraft by a power surge, igniting a fuel fire that began to "cook off"  bombs. Procedural improvements after the Forrestal fire helped reduce damage and casualties in the Enterprise fire.

Investigation
A JAG Manual investigation began immediately after the fire, in accordance with Navy policy. The investigation determined that the initial explosion was caused by the huffer exhaust overheating the Zuni rocket. Investigators also determined that an airman had observed the exhaust and had raised concerns about the placement of the huffer, but personnel were involved in other tasks and may not have completely understood what was being said due to the ambient noise on the flight deck. However, the investigators also noted that moving the unit might not have prevented the initial explosion due to the estimated temperature of the rocket by that time. The investigation also revealed that flight deck personnel did not have an understanding of ordnance cook-off times or an appreciation of the hazards posed by live ordnance on the flight deck.

The Forrestal investigation revealed that only half of the ship's crew and none of the air wing had attended firefighting school. When the Enterprise fire erupted, 96 percent of the ship's crew had attended firefighting training, along with 86 percent of the air wing. Lack of redundancies in communication systems and firefighting components were deemed to have hurt firefighting operations. Further factors included a lack of communication between the Air Boss (who was responsible for flight and hangar deck firefighting) and the Damage Control Assistant (who was responsible for all other firefighting operations), and overloading the firefighting system by activating multiple systems at once. 

Investigators generally praised the firefighting operation aboard Enterprise. Specific praise was given to the medical department, who were credited with saving countless lives, and to the establishment of a damage-control training team that helped with damage-control training. Enterprise had also established a competitive program between its repair parties to increase effectiveness. Praise was also directed to the captain of USS Rogers, who navigated his ship within feet of Enterprise to aid firefighting efforts.

The investigators recommended a redesign of the air-start unit to vent the exhaust upward instead of to the side. They also recommended educating flight deck personnel on ordnance cook-off temperatures and times, and increasing the length of the hose that delivers the air from the huffer to the aircraft. Other recommendations included: install redundant communication and control systems, improve communication between key senior personnel, and redesign the head covering worn by flight deck firefighters. Investigators also recommended cross-training shipboard dentists as anesthetists, as one had been assigned to Enterprise which allowed the medical department to perform additional emergency surgery during the fire.

References 

Maritime incidents in 1969
Non-combat naval accidents
Ship fires
Fires in the United States
January 1969 events in the United States
1969 fires in the United States
Explosions in 1969
United States Navy in the Vietnam War
United States Navy in the 20th century
Aircraft carriers of the United States Navy
Aircraft carrier fires
1969 in Hawaii
1969 disasters in the United States